Adam Fletcher (born 1 December 1983) is a former rugby league footballer who played in the 2000s. He played for the Castleford Tigers in the Super League, at the end of 2006 and returned in 2008. He was released at the end of his contract at the end of 2008.

References

External links
Castleford Tigers profile
Statistics at rugbyleagueproject.org

1983 births
Living people
Australian rugby league players
Castleford Tigers players
Place of birth missing (living people)
Rugby articles needing expert attention
Rugby league wingers